The United College of Hong Kong is one of the constituent colleges of the Chinese University of Hong Kong, and one of the three original colleges when the university was founded in 1963. It was founded in June 1956 by the amalgamation of five colleges: Wah Kiu, Canton Overseas, Wen Hua, Kwang Hsia and Ping Jing, members of a group of post-secondary colleges or former private universities based in Kwangtung (Guangdong).

Motto
The motto of the United College is "Ming De Xin Min" (明德新民), meaning "make one's virtues shine and renew the people". It was modified from a passage in the old classic The Great Learning (大學).

College heads 
Heads of United College:

 Dr Tseung Fat-im (1957–1959)
 Dr Lin Dao-yang (1960–1963)
 Dr Cheng Tung-choy (1963–1977)
 Professor Hsueh Shou-sheng (1977–1980)
 Professor Chen Tien-chi (1980–1988)
 Professor Lee Cheuk-yu (1988–1998)
 Professor Wong Kwan-yiu (1998–2002)
 Professor Fung Kwok-pui (2002–2012)
 Professor Yu Jimmy Chai-mei (2012 – present)

Main buildings and facilities

Tsang Shiu Tim Building
The administrative building of the United College. Choi Koon Shum General Education Resource Centre, established in 1995, is located on the fourth floor of the building.

T. C. Cheng Building
A building mainly serves for educational purposes.

Si Yuan Amenities Centre
Established in 2001, it is located on the lower ground floor of T. C. Cheng Building. Its most well-known feature is the bar, which is the only one in the Chinese University of Hong Kong. It also has a karaoke lounge and a pool table for the use of students, staff and alumni.

Wu Chung Multimedia Library
The majority of the multimedia resources of the university can be found in the library. The library is well equipped by computers capable in playing various multimedia resources. Tien Chi Microcomputer Laboratory is situated on the ground floor of the library, providing computers for students' use.

Cheung Chuk Shan Amenities Building
The main amenities building of the college. The Student Union, gymnasium, non-residential halls (Ping Fan Hall and Pak Chuen Hall), student canteen and staff restaurant are all found in the building.

Si Yuan Amphitheatre
Established in 2006, it serves as a multi-purpose outdoor theatre.

Tennis Courts
The two courts are managed by the Physical Education Unit. They are located at the junction of United Road and Residence Road.

Student hostels
The United College has a total of four student hostels which can accommodate around 1200 students.

Adam Schall Residence
Established in 1971, Adam Schall Residence is the College's first and largest student hostel, and was built jointly with the Society of Jesus. The Adam Schall Residence underwent major renovation and spatial re-organization in the summer of 2007. Since then the 5-storey building houses a total of 440 students of both genders, separated into two wings. The building comprises mainly triple rooms, each equipped with air-conditioning and fans. Facilities provided include a multipurpose hall, 7 pantries (the biggest one is shared by both genders), 2 study rooms (one for each gender), table-tennis tables, a television room, a tuck shop, a music room, etc. A unique feature of Adam Schall Residence is that it houses a chapel offering Catholic services for the benefit of the entire University.

Bethlehem Hall
The Bethlehem Hall was established in 1978. It is located next to the Adam Schall Residence and provides places for about 230 students. It consists of five floors, with students of different genders on different floors. Facilities provided include a common room, a study room, etc.

Hang Seng Hall
Hang Seng Hall was established in 1986 and provides around 280 places for students of both gender. For the first to third floor is for male and the forth to sixth floor is for female. Facilities include a tuck shop, a snooker table, etc.

Chan Chun Ha Hostel
The Chan Chun Ha Hostel, established in 2004, is the newest of the four hostels. It provides around 300 places for students. It consists of ten floors. On the top floor a bridge connects the hostel with the campus of United College.

Landmarks

 Ming De Mural
United College Water Tower
United College Cascade
United College Time Capsule
Sculptures
Glorious United Man
Release
Cavort
Dancer
Ultimate Cosmos
Om
Phoenix Dance

References

External links
Official website of United College
Official College Facebook Page: United College of Chinese University of Hong Kong 聯合書院
Website of Heng Sang Hall

Chinese University of Hong Kong
Ma Liu Shui